The Arlington Forest Historic District is a national historic district located at Arlington County, Virginia. It contains 810 contributing buildings and 3 contributing sites in a subdivision in South Arlington and two sites in North Arlington.  It was developed in four stages between 1939 and 1948, known as Southside, Northside, Greenbrier, and Broyhill's Addition. In the first phase, from 1939 to 1946, Meadowbrook, the builder, collaborated with locally prominent architect Robert O. Scholz to design the modest two-story brick homes with minimal Colonial Revival detailing.  The district is characterized by orderly rows of detached two-story, single family dwellings with minimal Colonial Revival style decorative detailing.  It is representative of a mid-20th century planned mixed use community in Arlington County.

It was listed on the National Register of Historic Places in 2005.

References

Neighborhoods in Arlington County, Virginia
Houses on the National Register of Historic Places in Virginia
Colonial Revival architecture in Virginia
Historic districts in Arlington County, Virginia
National Register of Historic Places in Arlington County, Virginia
Houses in Arlington County, Virginia
Historic districts on the National Register of Historic Places in Virginia